Sydney Light Rail may refer to:

 the current multi-line light rail system in Sydney, Australia (see Light rail in Sydney)
 the original name of the Inner West Light Rail, the first of the light rail lines in Sydney, Australia